The Optional Protocol to the Convention Against Torture and Other Cruel, Inhuman or Degrading Treatment or Punishment (commonly known as the Optional Protocol to the Convention Against Torture (OPCAT)) is a treaty that supplements to the 1984 United Nations Convention Against Torture. It establishes an international inspection system for places of detention modeled on the system that has existed in Europe since 1987 (the Committee for the Prevention of Torture).

The OPCAT was adopted by the United Nations General Assembly in New York on 18 December 2002, and it entered into force on 22 June 2006. As of June 2019, the Protocol has 76 signatories and 90 parties.

History
The idea for this scheme of torture prevention goes back to the Swiss Committee for the Prevention of Torture (today Association for the Prevention of Torture, APT), founded in 1977 by Jean-Jacques Gautier in Geneva. It envisaged the establishment of a worldwide system of inspection of places of detention, which later took the form of an Optional Protocol to the UN Convention Against Torture and Other Cruel, Inhuman or Degrading Treatment or Punishment (1984). For a long time, however, the necessary support for such an optional protocol was not forthcoming. As a consequence, the UN Committee Against Torture (CAT) had at its disposal only relatively weak instruments: it could analyse and discuss the self-reports of the respective governments and create the institution of a Special Rapporteur on Torture. But neither CAT nor its Special Rapporteur had the power to visit countries, let alone inspect prisons, without the respective government's permission. In 1987, the Council of Europe realized the original idea on a regional level with its European Convention for the Prevention of Torture. On this basis, the European Committee for the Prevention of Torture has demonstrated that regular visits, reports and recommendations to the governments as well as the publication of these reports and the governments' reactions the viability of this model. This in turn led to a breakthrough within the United Nations: OPCAT was created and opened for signatures on 18 December 2002 by the UN General Assembly.

After ratification by 20 states, the Optional Protocol came into force on 22 June 2006.

Ratification status
As of October 2019, 90 states have ratified the protocol: Afghanistan, Albania, Argentina, Armenia, Australia, Austria, Azerbaijan, Belize, Benin, Bolivia, Bosnia and Herzegovina, Brazil, Bulgaria, Burkina Faso, Burundi, Cambodia, Cape Verde, the Central African Republic, Chile, Costa Rica, Croatia, Cyprus, Czech Republic, Democratic Republic of the Congo, Denmark, Ecuador, Estonia, Finland, France, Gabon, Georgia, Germany, Ghana, Greece, Guatemala, Honduras, Hungary, Iceland, Italy, Kazakhstan, Kyrgyzstan, Lebanon, Liberia, Liechtenstein, Lithuania, Luxembourg, Macedonia, Madagascar, Maldives, Mali, Malta, Mauritania, Mauritius, Mexico, Moldova, Mongolia, Montenegro, Morocco, Mozambique, Nauru, Netherlands, New Zealand, Nicaragua, Niger, Nigeria, Norway, Panama, Paraguay, Peru, Philippines, Poland, Portugal, Romania, Rwanda, Senegal, Serbia, Slovenia, South Africa, South Sudan, Spain, Sri Lanka, State of Palestine, Sweden, Switzerland, Togo, Tunisia, Turkey, Ukraine, United Kingdom, and Uruguay.

A further 15 states have signed but not ratified the protocol: Angola, Belgium, Cameroon, Chad, Republic of the Congo, East Timor, Guinea, Guinea-Bissau, Ireland, Sierra Leone, Slovakia, Venezuela, and Zambia.

See also
 Istanbul Protocol
 International Rehabilitation Council for Torture Victims
 Center for Victims of Torture

References

External links
 Text of the protocol — Office of the United Nations High Commissioner for Human Rights
 List of parties
 Association for the Prevention of Torture
 The Center for Victims of Torture

Anti-torture treaties
Human rights instruments
United Nations treaties
Treaties concluded in 2002
Treaties entered into force in 2006
Treaties of Albania
Treaties of Argentina
Treaties of Armenia
Treaties of Austria
Treaties of Azerbaijan
Treaties of Belize
Treaties of Benin
Treaties of Bolivia
Treaties of Bosnia and Herzegovina
Treaties of Brazil
Treaties of Bulgaria
Treaties of Burkina Faso
Treaties of Burundi
Treaties of Cambodia
Treaties of Cape Verde
Treaties of the Central African Republic
Treaties of Chile
Treaties of Costa Rica
Treaties of Croatia
Treaties of Cyprus
Treaties of the Czech Republic
Treaties of the Democratic Republic of the Congo
Treaties of Denmark
Treaties of Ecuador
Treaties of Estonia
Treaties of Finland
Treaties of France
Treaties of Gabon
Treaties of Georgia (country)
Treaties of Germany
Treaties of Ghana
Treaties of Greece
Treaties of Guatemala
Treaties of Honduras
Treaties of Hungary
Treaties of Italy
Treaties of Kazakhstan
Treaties of Kyrgyzstan
Treaties of Lebanon
Treaties of Liberia
Treaties of Liechtenstein
Treaties of Lithuania
Treaties of Luxembourg
Treaties of Madagascar
Treaties of the Maldives
Treaties of Mali
Treaties of Malta
Treaties of Mauritania
Treaties of Mauritius
Treaties of Mexico
Treaties of Mongolia
Treaties of Montenegro
Treaties of Morocco
Treaties of Mozambique
Treaties of Nauru
Treaties of the Netherlands
Treaties of New Zealand
Treaties of Nicaragua
Treaties of Niger
Treaties of Nigeria
Treaties of Norway
Treaties of Panama
Treaties of Paraguay
Treaties of Peru
Treaties of the Philippines
Treaties of Poland
Treaties of Portugal
Treaties of Romania
Treaties of Rwanda
Treaties of Moldova
Treaties of the State of Palestine
Treaties of Sri Lanka
Treaties of Senegal
Treaties of Serbia
Treaties of Slovenia
Treaties of South Sudan
Treaties of Spain
Treaties of Sweden
Treaties of Switzerland
Treaties of North Macedonia
Treaties of Togo
Treaties of Tunisia
Treaties of Turkey
Treaties of Ukraine
Treaties of the United Kingdom
Treaties of Uruguay
2002 in New York City
Treaties adopted by United Nations General Assembly resolutions
Treaties extended to Greenland
Treaties extended to the Faroe Islands
Treaties extended to the Isle of Man